The Human Capital Institute an institute for Talent management leadership related to human capital (human resources).  The institute conducts training, certification, research, education and events.  Membership includes Fortune 1000 and Forbes Global 2000 corporations, government agencies, global consultants and business schools. Human capital is one of the three components of intellectual capital and has become a primary focus in the knowledge economy.

The institute conducts research and training to determine best practices in regard to workforce planning, talent acquisition, onboarding and engagement, learning and development, succession and retention and talent management technologies. The association has also conducted research on the importance of human capital in the success of mergers and acquisitions

References

Talent and literary agencies